, also known by , his Chinese-style name  and , was a bureaucrat of the Ryukyu Kingdom.

Chōten was the second son of Prince Tomigusuku Chōkō, and he was also a younger brother of Prince Tomigusuku Chōshun.

Tomigusuku Chōshun and Takushi Ando were dispatched as a gratitude envoy for King Shō Iku's taking power to Edo, Japan, in 1832. However, Prince Tomigusuku died in Kagoshima on 23 September 1832 (lunar calendar 29 August). Chōten served as the political decoy of the prince, took the title "Prince Tomigusuku" and went to Edo. They sailed back in the next year.

Chōten served as a member of sanshikan from 1836 to 1839. He was sent to China together with Yō Tokushō and Ba Ikō as a gratitude envoy for King Shō Iku's investiture. In the next year, he was seriously ill on the way home and died in Fuzhou.

References

1839 deaths
Ueekata
Sanshikan
People of the Ryukyu Kingdom
Ryukyuan people
19th-century Ryukyuan people